Calvin Charles Luther (October 23, 1927 – May 8, 2021) was an American men's college basketball coach. He was the head coach at DePauw, Murray State, Longwood, UT Martin, and Bethel College. He was also head coach of the Egyptian national team.

Early life
Born in Valdosta, Georgia, Luther was an All-state football and basketball player at Bay View High School in Milwaukee. He played college basketball at Valparaiso from 1949-1951. He spent two years as a member of the 82nd Airborne Division and was a member of Fort Benning's basketball and championship-winning football teams.

Luther's coaching career began at the University of Illinois, where he spent three seasons as the freshman basketball while obtaining his master's degree.

DePauw
Luther became DePauw University's head coach in 1954. In his first season as head coach, he coached DePauw to a rare tie against Wabash. DePauw defeated Wabash 67-66, however the coaches of both teams decided the game should be recorded as a tie due to a scorers error. In four seasons with the Tigers, Luther had a 45-40-1 record; including the 1956-57 ICC Championship and a berth in the inaugural NCAA College Division Tourney.
He coached two of DePauw's 1,000 point scorers (#6 Bob Schrier - 1,415 and #22 John Bunnell 1,004)

Murray State
In 1958, Luther became Murray State's seventh head basketball coach. In his sixteen seasons at MSU, Luther's Racers had a 241-134 record and made the NCAA tournament twice. He was also Murray State's Athletic Director. In 1971, the Minnesota Golden Gophers hired Luther to coach the men's basketball team, but he changed his mind and turned the team down after accepting the position. Luther was named OVC Coach of the Year in 1964 and 1969.

Longwood
Luther spent nine seasons as the head coach of Division II Longwood University, where he was selected Mason-Dixon Conference and Kodak Division II South District coach of the year in 1988. One of his players, Jerome Kersey, would be drafted in the second round of the 1984 NBA draft. His overall record at Longwood was 136–105.

Egypt
Luther was the coach of the Egyptian national basketball team in 1990. Egypt finished 16th out of 16 teams in the 1990 FIBA World Championship.

Tennessee-Martin
Luther coached Tennessee-Martin from 1990-1999. There he compiled a 72-163 record. His 319 total victories while a coach in the OVC ranks first all-time in league history. Luther was named OVC Coach of the Year in 1996, making him the only coach to win Coach of the Year honors at two different OVC institutions. After leaving UT Martin, Luther spent one season as the coach of Bethel College before retiring.

Death
Luther died on May 8, 2021 at Hillview Nursing Center in Dresden, TN. His was married to Linda Wren Luther.

Head coaching record

References

1927 births
2021 deaths
American men's basketball coaches
American men's basketball players
Basketball coaches from Georgia (U.S. state)
Basketball players from Georgia (U.S. state)
Bay View High School alumni
Bethel Wildcats men's basketball coaches
DePauw Tigers men's basketball coaches
Guards (basketball)
Illinois Fighting Illini men's basketball coaches
Longwood Lancers men's basketball coaches
Military personnel from Georgia (U.S. state)
Murray State Racers athletic directors
Murray State Racers men's basketball coaches
People from Valdosta, Georgia
UT Martin Skyhawks men's basketball coaches
Valparaiso Beacons men's basketball players